Daniel Lang may refer to:

People 
 Daniel Lang (writer) (1913–1981), writer (Casualties of War)
 Daniel Lang (Ontario politician) (1919–1997), Canadian senator and lawyer from Ontario
 Daniel Lang (Yukon politician) (born 1948), Canadian senator from Yukon
 Daniel Lang (fencer) (born 1971), Swiss fencer
 Daniel Lang (footballer) (born 1992), German footballer

Fiction 
 Dan Lang, a character in the 1983 novel series Vampire Hunter D

See also
Danny Lange (born 1962), software developer
Dan Laing, sportscaster